Mohammed Al-Abdooli (Arabic:محمد العبدولي) (born 11 May 1997) is an Emirati footballer. He currently plays.

External links

References

Emirati footballers
1997 births
Living people
Al Jazira Club players
Fujairah FC players
Al Dhaid SC players
UAE First Division League players
UAE Pro League players
Association football defenders